Lhorong County is a county of the Qamdo Prefecture in the Tibet Autonomous Region. The word Lhorong means "valley in the south" or "river in the south" in Tibetan.

Geography and climate

Lhorong County is located in the northeast of the Tibet Autonomous Region, in the eastern Qinghai-Tibet Plateau and contains some 100 kilometres of the Nu River (Salween River). The Nu River flows through Tibet into Gongshan Dulong and Nu Autonomous County of Yunnan Province. It later flows through Lushui County and into Burma, eventually into the Indian Ocean. Lhorong County lies to the south-west of the Qamdo Prefecture. Banbar County lies to the northwest, Baxoi County lies across the river to the east, Banbar County to the west, Dêngqên County to the north, and Riwoqê County to the northeast. From east to west the county is 127 kilometers and from north to south the greatest distance of is 105 kilometres.  A county has a total area of 8048.4 square kikometres. The total population is around 36,000 people (1999), with estimates in 2003 being around 40,000. Other rivers of Lhorong County include the Jalan Song, Maqu, and the Zhuoma Lang. The county also contains numerous small lakes which the locals compare to 21 fairies.

The county has a temperate semi-arid plateau monsoon climate, with an average annual temperature of 5.1 ℃, the maximum air temperature (in July) being 14.5 ℃. The annual extreme minimum temperature is  -10.1 ℃ and annual mean maximum temperature is 31.2 ℃.  The country experiences 2,500 hours of sunshine annually on average, with a frost-free period of 120 days or so. The annual average rainfall is 439.7 millimeters, with much rain in August. Annual average relative humidity is around 50-55%.

Subdivisions
Lhorong County contains 4 towns, 7 townships, 76 administrative village municipalities and a total of 289 villages.

Settlements
Lhorong (village)

References

External links
Official site
Photograph

Counties of Tibet
Chamdo